Inape clarkeana is a species of moth of the family Tortricidae and is endemic to Colombia.

The ground colour of the forewings is pale yellow beige, the distal half with a pale brown patch. There is a darker patch at the wing base. The hindwings are pale yellow with beige marbling.

References

Moths described in 2003
Endemic fauna of Colombia
clarkeana
Moths of South America
Taxa named by Józef Razowski